The Daintree River Ferry is a cable ferry across the Daintree River in Queensland, Australia. The ferry provides the only sealed road access to this area.
 
The 43.2m ferry carries a maximum of 27 vehicles, and takes about 5 minutes to cross the river. It operates  from early morning until midnight, seven days a week, with limited hours on Christmas Day. The ferry is operated by a commercial contractor on behalf of the Douglas Shire Council. A toll is charged for the crossing, $45. - return for a car in 2023 but this toll keeps rising every year, managed through the local council's Ferry Fund. 

At busy times, for example during school holidays, some delays can occur waiting to cross the ferry. The construction of a bridge has been discussed, but has been rejected by Queensland State Government. The ferry was replaced in 2006, replacing the previous ferry which carried a maximum of 16 vehicles. This has substantially reduced any delays in making the crossing.

References

Far North Queensland
Ferries of Australia
Transport in Queensland
Cable ferries in Australia